Day After Tomorrow is a 1968 Italian Spaghetti Western film directed by Nick Nostro, written by Mariano De Lope, Simon O'Neill, Giovanni Simonelli and starring Richard Harrison, Pamela Tudor and José Bódalo. Music for the film was composed by Fred Bongusto and Berto Pisano.

Cast

References

External links
 

Spaghetti Western films
Films directed by Nick Nostro
Films with screenplays by Nick Nostro
Films scored by Fred Bongusto
Films scored by Berto Pisano
Films shot in Rome
Films shot in Almería
1960s Italian films